Calotes bachae is a species of lizards in the family Agamidae. It is known from southern Vietnam and eastern Cambodia. Its range may extend into southern Laos.

This species is found in open areas of Cat Tien National Park, in dense tropical forests in Bu Gia Map National Park and in parks in downtown Ho Chi Minh City. It was formerly thought that Calotes bachae was Calotes mystaceus which inhabits in Burma and Thailand due to their similar appearance. However, genetic analysis and studying the size and scale characteristics have shown that they are separate species. The result of study was published in an article on Zootaxa in January 2013.

References

B
Reptiles of Cambodia
Reptiles of Vietnam
Reptiles described in 2013
Taxa named by Timo Hartmann
Taxa named by Peter Geissler
Taxa named by Nikolay A. Poyarkov Jr.
Taxa named by Eduard Artashesovich Galoyan
Taxa named by Dennis Rödder
Taxa named by Wolfgang Böhme (herpetologist)